Centi may refer to:

 Centi-, a unit prefix in the metric system denoting a factor of one hundredth
 Giancarlo Centi (born 1959), Italian professional football coach and a former player
 Luis Fernando Centi (born 1976), Italian footballer

 Super Space Blaster Centi-Asteroid Invaderpedes 2, an American steampunk musical comedy project formed in San Diego in 2008

See also 
 Cento (disambiguation)